The Men's Double Advanced Metric Round Paraplegic was an archery competition in the 1984 Summer Paralympics.

Gold medalist was Frenchman J.M. Chapuis who won his fourth gold medal in archery.

Results

References

1984 Summer Paralympics events